Shapurgala is a fortress located on the left bank of Nakhchivanay, near the village with the same name in Shahbuz District of Nakhchivan Autonomous Republic.

See also
Architecture of Azerbaijan

References

Castles and fortresses in Azerbaijan
Monuments and memorials in Azerbaijan
Tourist attractions in Azerbaijan